Dulovo is a rural locality (a village) in Kubenskoye Rural Settlement, Vologodsky District, Vologda Oblast, Russia. The population was 17 as of 2002.

Geography 
The distance to Vologda is 74 km, to Kubenskoye is 29 km. Demino, Yefimovo, Krivoye, Dolmatovo, Lavrentyevo are the nearest rural localities.

References 

Rural localities in Vologodsky District